Sessenheim is a commune in the Bas-Rhin department in Grand Est in northeastern France.

Culture
Sessemheim was the setting for Johann Wolfgang Goethe's first love affair with Friederike Brion, a priest's daughter, which he immortalized in his Sesenheimer Lieder. This collection of poems was the foundation of his reputation as a poet.

See also
 Communes of the Bas-Rhin department

References

Communes of Bas-Rhin